Clubland, internationally known as Introducing the Dwights, is a 2007 Australian comedy-drama film, directed by Cherie Nowlan, written by Keith Thompson, and starring Oscar nominee Brenda Blethyn and Emma Booth. The film was nominated for eleven AFI awards, winning the award for best supporting actress for Emma Booth. It sold to Warner Independent Pictures for $4.1 million,<ref name="Urban-1">Urban Cinephile NOWLAN, CHERIE - CLUBLAND. (28 June 2007) Retrieved 14 March 2015.</ref> after debuting at Sundance Film Festival, where it gained standing ovations. The film opened in the U.S. on 4 July holiday weekend, the first Australian film ever to do so.

Plot
Life for shy 21-year-old Tim Maitland is not always smooth sailing. His mum Jean is a cafeteria worker by day who hits the comedy club circuit by night, while his dad John is busy trying to recapture his fifteen minutes of fame from when he was a country and western singer back in 1975. But when the feisty beautiful Jill walks into Tim's life, things seem to be looking up. Unfortunately, there's another woman in Tim's life, one who will stand between him and the perfect romance: his mother.

Cast
 Brenda Blethyn — Jean Dwight
 Khan Chittenden — Tim Maitland
 Emma Booth — Jill 
 Richard Wilson — Mark
 Philip Quast — Ronnie Stubbs
 Frankie J. Holden — John Maitland
 Rebecca Gibney — Lana 
 Katie Wall —  Kelly

Box officeClubland'' grossed $1.5 million at the box office in Australia.

See also
 Cinema of Australia

References

External links

Goalpost Pictures Website
Clubland at the National Film and Sound Archive.
'Introducing the Dwights' Trailer

2000s coming-of-age comedy-drama films
2007 films
Australian coming-of-age comedy-drama films
2007 comedy-drama films
Films directed by Cherie Nowlan
2000s English-language films